The 2017 season is Brann's second season back in Eliteserien since their relegation at the end of the 2014 season.

Squad

Out on loan

Transfers

Winter

In:

Out:

Summer

In:

Out:

Competitions

Mesterfinalen

Eliteserien

Results summary

Results by round

Results

Table

Norwegian Cup

UEFA Europa League

Qualifying rounds

Squad statistics

Appearances and goals

|-
|colspan="14"|Players away from Brann on loan:
|-
|colspan="14"|Players who left Brann during the season:
|}

Goal scorers

Disciplinary record

References

SK Brann
SK Brann seasons